The House of Priuli was a prominent aristocratic family in the Republic of Venice; they entered the Venetian nobility early in the 14th century. Their members include:

Andriana Priuli - wife of Francesco Cornaro, Doge of Venice (1625–1629) 
Antonio Priuli (1548–1623), 94th Doge of Venice (1618–1623)
Antonio Priuli ( 1669), Venetian official
Antonio Priuli (fl. 1670), provveditore generale of Dalmatia
Antonio Maria Priuli, bishop of Venice 1738-1767; bishop of Padova 1767-1772
Bianca Priuli - mother of Bertuccio Valiero, Doge of Venice (1656–1658)
Giovanni Priuli (1575–1626), Venetian composer and organist
Girolamo Priuli (1476–1547) aristocrat and diarist 
Girolamo Priuli (1486–1567) 83rd Doge of Venice, starting in 1559
Hieronimo Priuli, Podesta e capitanio di Rovigo, Provveditor General di Polesina, 17th century
Lorenzo Priuli (1489–1559) 82nd Doge of Venice, starting in 1556 
Lorenzo Priuli (cardinal) (1537-1600), Patriarch of Venice 1591-1600
Ludovico Priuli assistant to Cardinal Reginald Pole (1500–1558)
Matteo Priuli (bishop), Bishop of Novigrad (1561–1565), and Bishop of Vicenza (1565–1579)
Matteo Priuli (cardinal)
Michele Priuli (died 1603), bishop of Vicenza 1579-1603
Michele Priuli, son of Francesco, Venetian Senator and Procurator (1627)
Marieta Morosina Priuli (fl. 1665) Italian composer
Nicolo' Priuli - (1792- prior to 1855) statesman and patron
Pietro Priuli, bishop of Bergamo, cardinal

References

Sources

House of Priuli